Nawabganj may refer to:

Bangladesh
 Nawabganj Town, administrative centre of Chapai Nawabganj District, Bangladesh
 Chapai Nawabganj District
 Nawabganj Upazila, Dhaka
 Nawabganj Upazila, Dinajpur

India

Uttar Pradesh
Nawabganj Bird Sanctuary, Unnao District
Nawabganj, Barabanki, a tehsil
Nawabganj, Bareilly
Nawabganj, Gonda
Nawabganj, Unnao

West Bengal
Nawabganj, North 24 Parganas